Raja Rao Ram Baksh Singh  was a Bais Rajput Rajput Raja Rao of Daundia Khera in Unnao district of Uttar Pradesh in the then Oudh province that was a vassal state of the British East India Company. He was one of the leaders of the Sepoy Mutiny, and a close associate of Nana Sahib. He was hanged by the British on 28 December 1857 for taking part in the revolt and being found guilty of the killing of British soldiers. In 1992, the Government of India built a memorial at the place where he was hanged to honor his death.

The dilapidated remains of his fort - consisting of the ruins of his royal mansion, a huge campus spread over hundreds of acres, a temple to Shiva which has been in use for more than 180 years, and various other structures - have been in the news recently due to an urban legend of gold treasure buried there. 
 The Archaeological Survey of India, upon excavation his fort in October 2013, discovered a brick wall, sherds, pieces of bangles, hopscotch toys, and a mud floor which could date back to the 17-19th centuries, but no gold treasure or any other valuable materials.

References
`

Revolutionaries of the Indian Rebellion of 1857
1857 deaths
People from Unnao district
Executed revolutionaries
People executed by British India by hanging
Executed Indian people
Year of birth unknown